Indian Town Point is a prominent headland on the eastern coast of Antigua.

References 

Headlands of Antigua and Barbuda